Sven Di Domenico (born 15 March 1982) is a Luxembourgian footballer who currently plays as a defender for CS Grevenmacher in Luxembourg's domestic National Division.

External links

1982 births
Living people
Luxembourgian footballers
Luxembourg international footballers
Association football midfielders